The Space Development Agency (SDA) is a United States Space Force direct-reporting unit tasked with deploying disruptive space technology. A primary focus is space-based missile defense using large global satellite constellations made up of industry-procured low-cost satellites. The SDA has been managed by the United States Space Force since October 2022.

History 
The agency was established by Mike Griffin in 2019 with his appointment to Under Secretary of Defense (R&E) by President Donald Trump. Griffin had long advocated for low Earth orbit constellations to eliminate U.S. vulnerability to ballistic missiles with his work on space-based interceptors for the Strategic Defense Initiative and Brilliant Pebbles in the 1980s. However these programs dissolved in the 1990s due to excess cost and political disagreement. Later, the United States and other countries developed hypersonic weapons, which Griffin argued were thermally dimmer and could only be reliably tracked by low-flying satellites with infrared sensors, creating a need to resurrect such programs. In addition to hypersonic weapons, the memorandum establishing the SDA also calls for a new space architecture "not bound by legacy methods or culture" that provides unifying command and control through a cross-domain artificial intelligence-enabled network.

The Space Development Agency proposed the National Defense Space Architecture, later renamed the Proliferated Warfighting Space Architecture. It  advances a network of global orbiters composed of layers with different military capabilities such as communications, surveillance, global navigation, battle management, deterrence, and missile defense. The satellite constellation is to be interconnected by free-space optical laser terminals in a secure command and control optical mesh network. Satellites are to be low cost and "proliferated" in low Earth orbit. New commercial technology such as reusable launch systems have reduced deployment costs and new mass-produced commercial satellites offer less "juicy" targets for anti-satellite weapons by being inexpensive and potentially hard to distinguish from other commercial satellites. Development is to follow the spiral model, incorporating learning from previous iterations and launching new satellite replacements regularly as the useful lifetime of each is relatively short. The SDA expects to field and maintain a constellation of at least 1,000 satellites on orbit by 2026.

The SDA has mostly avoided flaws that plagued earlier proliferated missile defense programs such as Brilliant Pebbles. The Anti-Ballistic Missile Treaty was a major impediment in the past, as these systems were deemed non-compliant with the treaty by Congress. However, George W. Bush withdrew the United States from the treaty in 2002, eliminating this barrier. Over the years, launch and manufacturing costs have been greatly reduced. SDIO research on the DC-X has since led to commercial reusable launch vehicles such as SpaceX's Falcon 9 rocket. Meanwhile mass manufacturing as with Starlink has proven the potential for lower satellite build costs.

Political and administrative opposition to SDA came from 24th Secretary of the Air Force Heather Wilson who argued that "launching hundreds of cheap satellites into theater as a substitute for the complex architectures where we provide key capabilities to the warfighter will result in failure on America's worst day if relied upon alone." Members of Congress also gave concerns that SDA would drain resources and jobs from Air Force and questioned why DoD had to create a separate organization to circumvent its own procurement process. Despite the pushback, the Pentagon did not require congressional authorization to create the SDA, and Wilson was overruled by Patrick M. Shanahan, who became acting defense secretary by appointment of Donald Trump. He placed the new agency under the authority and control of Mike Griffin who was also appointed as Under Secretary of Defense (R&E).

Despite these early success, SDA still faces critical challenges. The Union of Concerned Scientists warned SDA could escalate tensions with Russia and China and called the project "fundamentally destabilizing". Both China and Russia brought concerns to the United Nations about the U.S. plans for militarization of space. The Carnegie Endowment for International Peace has advocated for better use of arms control and international agreements such as a treaty halting related development by all parties to prevent an arms race in space.

Critics have reiterated longstanding concerns that ground-based lasers can easily "paint" satellites in low Earth orbit, temporarily blinding their sensors. The APS reporting the energy needed for this is very low. Likewise, RF jamming is simpler when communication and radar satellites are in lower altitudes as less power is needed to saturate their low-noise amplifiers. It is also far easier to launch an anti-satellite weapon to destroy satellites in low Earth orbit (as demonstrated with small ASM-135 or RIM-161 missiles) given much less energy is required to kinetically intersect than to enter and maintain orbit. An adversary would simply need to "punch a hole" in the constellation immediately before launching an attack. When the Biden Administration took ownership of the program in 2021, they appeared to take heed of these concerns but still signed on to a $500M increase for the agency in the FY2023 spending bill.

SDA awarded its first contracts in August 2020. Lockheed Martin received $188 million and York Space Systems received $94 million to each build 10 data relay satellites for its transport layer. In October 2020, SDA chose SpaceX and L3Harris Technologies to develop a deluxe military version of the Starlink satellite bus, later named Starshield. The first tranche of satellites were originally scheduled to launch September 2022. However, the launch slipped due to supply-chain issues for microelectronics such as radios, software problems, and protests by Ratheon and Airbus over procurement and evaluation process. SDA industry partners now include SpaceX, L3Harris Technologies, Northrop Grumman, Ball Aerospace and General Dynamics. SDA’s current schedule expects Tranche 0 capability will be on orbit in time to support a summer 2023 demonstration.

A number of experimental satellites were launched in 2021. SDA plans to test some of the key technologies in a series of on-orbit experiments that went up on Transporter-2: Mandrake 2, the Laser Interconnect and Networking Communications System (LINCS), and the Prototype On-orbit Experimental Testbed (POET).

Projects and research 

Among the SDA projects:
"Optical communications between satellites, and from satellites to a military drone aircraft". Including the CubeSat based Laser Interconnect and Networking Communication System (LINCS).
 Provide a resilient, persistent response to ballistic missile detection
 Build the JADC2 satellite backbone using the National Defense Space Architecture (NDSA):
The satellite constellations are in near-polar low Earth orbit. Hundreds of satellites are expected by the end of the 2020s. "Would you be able to take out some of these satellites? Probably. Would you be able to take out all of these satellites? Probably not, before you are going to have a really bad day."—Derek Tournear 
 NExT (National Defense Space Architecture (NDSA) Experimental Testbed) is a test bed of 10 space vehicles and associated mission-enabling ground systems, for realizing various aspects of the NDSA, in miniature, before NDSA's larger, later scheduled deployments. In particular, the capability to retain and/or relay messages for command and control (C2) can then be demonstrated on the NExT test bed, before deployment at scale.
Rapid response launch proliferated C2; SDA remains the rapid launch proliferated arm for the Space Force.
User equipment (Earth stations and weapon systems) SDA has selected the "ground Operations and Integration (O&I) segment for Tranche 1".
Transport layer intersatellite data Tranche 1 Transport Layer (T1TL): T1TL forms a mesh network in a constellation of small satellites in Low earth orbit (LEO). Each satellite would have 4 optical links. SDA may have awarded 3 contracts totalling $1.8 billion to 3 firms, each for 42 satellites to be launched by September 2024. However, there is still a funding constraint in the FY2022 budget. 
Tracking layer handles launched items, connects to existing user equipment Two contractors will each build 14 satellites for the Tranche 1 Tracking Layer as of 16 July 2022; these satellites will be in Low Earth Orbit (LEO) by 2025; hundreds of satellites are planned for the Tracking layer. The Tracking Layer is capable of tracking hypersonic missiles throughout their flight, by their heat signatures.
Custody layer handles items not yet launched from objects as big as a truck, connects to existing user equipment
Battle management ("autonomy, tipping and queuing and data fusion")
Navigation layer is not finalized, provides navigation & launch data
Deterrence layer is situational awareness of cislunar space vehicles

Launches

SDA's first Tranche 0 launch had been scheduled for December 2022; however tests of 8 of the satellites that had been expected to launch indicated each had a noisy power supply. The contractor, York Space Systems will retrofit filters on the satellites at no cost to the government; the Tranche 0 launch that had been scheduled for December 2022 has been delayed until March 2023 for 10 satellites, including the 8 from York Space Systems. The second Tranche 0 launch, for the remaining 18 satellites in Tranche 0, which had been scheduled for March 2023 is now delayed to June 2023 at the earliest.

Management 
By design, the functions for acquisition and sustainment (A&S) are the responsibility of another under secretary of defense; this separation of function decouples the technology development of a working prototype system, even the systems as complicated as those taken on by the SDA, from overcomplication induced by the processes of the DoD.

The SDA has relied heavily on "Section 804" Mid-Tier Acquisitions (MTAs) to avoid traditional defense procurement requirements. SDA has been able to forgo a number of reporting activities by breaking up larger programs into numerous two-year rapid fielding projects that each qualify as MTAs. Members of Congress and the Government Accountability Office have said this obfuscates costs and limits transparency. The FY23 omnibus appropriations act, signed by President Joe Biden on 29 December 2022, levies new reporting and certification requirements on the Pentagon regarding the use of MTAs and other rapid prototype programs. Industry participants such as MITRE Acquisition Chief Pete Modigliani have said the new requirements would "drastically impede DoD’s rapid acquisition abilities" for SDA and other programs.

See also
Automatic Dependent Surveillance–Broadcast
Automatic identification system (AIS)
Earth observation
Intelligence, surveillance and reconnaissance (ISR)
Joint All-Domain Command and Control (JADC2)
Satellite navigation

Notes and References

United States Space Force